Aroa plana is a moth of the family Erebidae first described by Francis Walker in 1855. It is found in India and Sri Lanka. The caterpillar is known to feed on Bambusa species.

References

Moths of Asia
Moths described in 1855